Hockin is a surname. Notable people with the surname include:

Ben Hockin (born 1986), Paraguayan swimmer
Bill Hockin (born 1938), Canadian Anglican bishop
Robert Hockin (1846–1925), Canadian politician
Tom Hockin (born 1938), Canadian politician

See also
Hockin railway station, Manitoba, Canada
Hockinson, Washington, city in Washington State, USA